Angela Sorby is an American poet, professor, and literary scholar.

Biography
She was born in Seattle, Washington and teaches at Marquette University in Milwaukee, Wisconsin. Her main teaching areas are American literature and creative writing and main academic interests are American poetry, popular culture, and children's literature. She is particularly interested in how poetry engages with children and childhood.

Selected works
Distance Learning (New Issues Press, 1998); 
Schoolroom Poets:  Childhood, Performance, and the Place of American Poetry (University Press of New England, 2005)  
Bird Skin Coat (University of Wisconsin Press, 2009).
Over the River and Through the Wood:  An Anthology of Nineteenth-Century American Children's Poetry, co-edited with Karen Kilcup. Johns Hopkins University Press, 2013
The Sleeve Waves] (poems).  Madison, WI: University of Wisconsin Press, 2014

Literary awards
Felix Pollak Prize
John Fiske Poetry Prize, University of Chicago
Midwest Book Award
Brittingham Prize in Poetry Lorine Niedecker Award
Fulbright fellowship
Honor Book Prize from the Children's Literature Association
Discovery/The Nation Prize
Lorine Niedecker Prize

References

External links
Marquette University Faculty Page
http://www.pw.org/content/angela_sorby_1
http://uwpress.wisc.edu/books/4555.htm
http://poems.com/poem.php?date=14654

Writers from Seattle
Marquette University faculty
Living people
American women poets
20th-century American writers
20th-century American women writers
21st-century American writers
21st-century American women writers
Year of birth missing (living people)
American women academics